The West Link is a railway tunnel under construction under central Gothenburg. The purpose of the project is to increase capacity and reduce travel times on the Gothenburg network by changing the Gothenburg Central Station from a terminus to an underground transit station. Two new underground stations, Haga and Korsvägen, will also be built.

Of the 1.02 million people (2018) who live in Greater Gothenburg (1.7 million in Västra Götaland County), 450,000 people live outside the Gothenburg municipality. Approximately 175,000 people in the region commute to or from Gothenburg Municipality daily. The majority of these people use cars for transportation and the roads in the region are overloaded. Better rail communications to different parts of Greater Gothenburg and better connections to current public transport networks would improve the situation. There is a political wish to reduce car dependency and increase public transport usage. Significant sums of money have been – and are being – invested in rail infrastructure in the other Swedish urban areas such as the Stockholm and Malmö regions (over 40 bn SEK each during 1990-2010). Rail investment in the greater Gothenburg area has not kept up with these other urban areas.

The largest improvement according to the proposed plan would be for commuters from places along the railways from Kungsbacka/Borås and who work or study near Haga station, where a large part of the University of Gothenburg is located. 15 minutes could be saved per journey. Time would be also saved on other journeys, for example around 5 minutes from Alingsås to Sahlgrenska or Chalmers.

The main reason to build the tunnel is to increase capacity. The Gothenburg Central Station has no capacity for more trains in rush hours, which obstructs the wish to increase train traffic and build a new railway to Borås, the second largest city in the province, which has dense bus traffic to Gothenburg.

History

Planning process 
As early as the 1950s there were plans for a tunnel under the inner city for railbound vehicles, then for trams. The plans were abandoned because of the cost. The city has to finance tramways, while the government finances railways.

The planning process has taken a long time, being included in preliminary city plans in the mid 90s under the project name "Centrumtunneln". A feasibility study was conducted in 2001–2002 by Banverket in cooperation with Västra Götalandsregionen, Västtrafik, Göteborgsregionen, and the city of Gothenburg. Similar rail tunnel projects have already been implemented in Malmö and in Stockholm.

Västlänken is not part of the Trafikverket Future plan (swe: Framtidsplan) 2004–2015, nor the alternative plan. Construction could start earlier since the Västra Götaland Regional Council is willing to invest money in the project.

Routes 
Banverket investigated three routes for Västlänken, including new stations along the routes in the city centre. The route alternatives were named after the proposed new stations: Haga–Korsvägen, Haga–Chalmers, and Korsvägen. In addition to these underground alternatives, an expansion of the current rail network to the south, with a larger terminus station, was also investigated, named Förstärkningsalternativet.

Decision 
On December 19, 2007, Banverket chose the Haga-Korsvägen alternative as it best fulfilled the goals for the expansion. A majority of other governmental bodies to which the proposed routes were referred for consideration also agreed on that opinion.

Construction 
The construction cost for the project is estimated at SEK 14.5 billion, using a price index of January 1, 2007. By 2012 the estimated cost had increased to 20 billion. The cost of the project will be partially financed by road tolls levied on vehicles entering and leaving central Gothenburg, as well as on those simply passing by the city on the major thoroughfares.

The official construction start ceremony took place on 30 May 2018.

Art 

Trafikverket (the Swedish Department of Transportation) are hosting a public art project from 2018 through 2026 to make the building fences less of a negative intrusion in the city. There are 8 kilometers of building fences during the construction period, 2,8 to 4 meters high. Trafikverket publicly asked artists to submit ideas and presentations of artworks that could be part of the project. The first 2 artworks were created in 2018. The big start was in 2019. There are or will be artworks in Centralen, Kanaltorget, Sankt Eriksgatan, Västa Sjöfarten, Packhusplatsen, Skeppsbron, Södra Hamngatan, Rosenlund, Haga, Pustervik, Linnéplatsen, och Korsvägen. The project is called Planksidan.

See also 
City Tunnel, Malmö
Citybanan, Stockholm
Gothenburg quadricentennial jubilee

References 

Railway lines in Sweden
Railway tunnels in Sweden
Rail transport in Gothenburg
Proposed tunnels in Sweden
Proposed public transport in Sweden
Proposed rail infrastructure in Sweden
Proposed railway tunnels in Europe
West Coast Line (Sweden)
Underground commuter rail
2025 in rail transport